TV Art is a television channel in North Macedonia started in 1992 and closed down for political reasons on 2016.

See also
 Television in North Macedonia

References

External links
 

Television channels in North Macedonia